Oliver Salvatore Gustavo Wahlgren Ingrosso (born 30 December 1989) is a Swedish DJ, music producer and actor.

Career
He debuted with a major role in the 2007 Swedish film Ciao Bella directed by Iranian-Swedish director Mani Maserrat-Agah. In the film he was credited with his birth name Oliver Wahlgren-Ingrosso. He played the role of Enrico, a young Italian football player who befriends Mustafa, a Swedish footballer of Iranian descent played by Poyan Karimi and trains Mustafa to "become" Massimo, just for the aim of attracting girls attending an international football tournament.

Using a shortened name Oliver Ingrosso, he started a musical career being a DJ in Progressive house music releasing an EP titled iTrack with Tim Berg (better known as Avicii) and Otto Knows and has appeared with well-known DJs like Tiësto, Armin van Buuren, Swedish House Mafia, Adrian Lux, Mandy and Adam Beyer. A great influence on him for pursuing a music career was the success of his cousin Sebastian Ingrosso, a long time member of Swedish House Mafia since 2005 and that opened up a lot of opportunities for Oliver Ingrosso. He has DJed in a great number of venues locally in Sweden and internationally in Toronto, New York, Brazil and Spain.

Personal life
Ingrosso comes from an artistic family. He is the grandson of Swedish actor, lyricist and singer Hans Wahlgren and renowned actress Christina Schollin. His parents are artist Pernilla Wahlgren and dancer and restaurateur Emilio Ingrosso. He has two younger siblings, Bianca Wahlgren Ingrosso (born 1994) and Benjamin Wahlgren Ingrosso (born 1997) who is a singer. His paternal grandparents are Carmine and Melina (Carmina) Ingrosso, both born in Taranto, Italy.

After his mother and father had a bitter divorce, Pernilla Wahlgren married Joachim Lennholm and they have another son, Theodor Wahlgren-Lennholm (born 2007).

Discography
EPs
2010: iTrack EP (Tim Berg, Oliver Ingrosso & Otto Knows) [Stealth Records]
Singles

*Did not appear in the official Belgian Ultratop 50 charts, but rather in the bubbling under Ultratip charts.

Other tracks
2010: "Gino" (Oliver Ingrosso, Tim Berg, Otto Knows)
2010: "LoopeDe" (Tim Berg vs. Oliver Ingrosso & Otto Knows)

Filmography 
2007: Ciao Bella as Enrico

References

External links 
Facebook: Oliver Ingrosso
Discogs.com: Oliver Ingrosso

Svenska Filminstitutet: Svensk Filmdatabas - Oliver Wahlgren-Ingrosso page

Swedish DJs
Swedish record producers
Swedish male film actors
1989 births
Living people
Male actors from Stockholm
Swedish people of Italian descent
Electronic dance music DJs